Héritier Bondongo Kabeya (born 29 August 1982), known by his stage name as Héritier Watanabe is a Congolese singer-songwriter, dancer from Kinshasa Democratic Republic of the Congo. He started singing at age of 10. he was a member of Wenge Musica Maison Mère from 2001 to 2015 he diced to quit the group and signed with Obouo Music Label of David Monsoh and release his first single title  "B.M" in July 2016 and his first album "Carrière d'honneur - Retirada" in November 2016.

See also 
Heriter Watanabe Artist Congolais Evolue dans le Groupe Wenge Musica Maison Mere 
 Werrason
 David Monsoh
 Ferre Gola

References 

Living people
People from Kinshasa
1982 births
21st-century Democratic Republic of the Congo male singers
Soukous musicians
Democratic Republic of the Congo songwriters
21st-century Democratic Republic of the Congo people